The Ventura Film Festival is an international film festival held each year in Ventura, California. The Ventura Film Festival features Academy Award-winning films and has been attended by Academy Award-winning celebrities.

In 2011 the Ventura Film Festival hosted the 50th Anniversary of West Side Story and the full cast of the film and gave a lifetime achievement awards to Academy Award winner/Golden Globe winner George Chakiris who starred in the film as Bernardo and Academy Award nominee/Golden Globe winner Russ Tamblyn who played the co-starring role of Riff in West Side Story. The 50th Anniversary of West Side Story was premiered in Ventura, California as the opening night film for the 2011 Ventura Film Festival and an additional, unrelated, screening was later held at the Chinese Theater in Hollywood and featured the "Footprint/Hands in the Cement" ceremony on Hollywood Boulevard with Academy Award winners Rita Moreno, George Chakiris, and Russ Tamblyn. The event was attended by many of Hollywood's most well known stars.

References

External links
Official Website

Film festivals in California
Ventura, California
Tourist attractions in Ventura County, California